Circus Romanelli (German: Der dumme August des Zirkus Romanelli) is a 1926 German silent comedy film directed by Georg Jacoby and starring Reinhold Schünzel, Claire Rommer and Victor Janson.

Cast 
Reinhold Schünzel as August  
Claire Rommer as Viola  
Victor Janson as director  
Trude Hesterberg as Frau Direktor  
Anton Pointner as Robert, Violas Bräutigam Kunstreiter  
Sig Arno as Jolli  
Paul Westermeier as Polli  
Julius Falkenstein as Eberhard, Majoratsherr auf Stockeling  
Elga Brink as Elga
Fritz Greiner as Karussellbesitzer  
Hermann Picha 
Paul Biensfeldt 
Paul Morgan

References

External links

Films of the Weimar Republic
German silent feature films
Films directed by Georg Jacoby
1926 comedy films
German comedy films
Circus films
German black-and-white films
Silent comedy films
1920s German films
1920s German-language films